The vice-chancellor is the executive head of Jawaharlal Nehru University.

Vice-Chancellors of JNU
The vice-chancellors of JNU are as follows.

References

Jawaharlal Nehru University
Vice-Chancellors by university in India